Computer-Generated Imagery (CGI) is a specific technology or application of computer graphics for creating or improving images in art, printed media,  simulators, videos and video games. These images are either static (i.e. still images) or dynamic (i.e. moving images). CGI both refers to 2D computer graphics and (more frequently) 3D computer graphics with the purpose of designing characters, virtual worlds, or scenes and special effects (in films, television programs, commercials, etc.). The application of CGI for creating/improving animations is called computer animation, or CGI animation.

History
The first feature film to make use of CGI was the 1973 film Westworld. Other early films that incorporated CGI include Star Wars: Episode IV (1977), Tron (1982), Golgo 13: The Professional (1983), The Last Starfighter (1984), Young Sherlock Holmes (1985) and Flight of the Navigator (1986). The first music video to use CGI was Dire Straits' award-winning "Money for Nothing" (1985), whose success was instrumental in giving the process mainstream exposure.

The evolution of CGI led to the emergence of virtual cinematography in the 1990s, where the vision of the simulated camera is not constrained by the laws of physics. Availability of CGI software and increased computer speeds have allowed individual artists and small companies to produce professional-grade films, games, and fine art from their home computers.

Static images and landscapes

 
Not only do animated images form part of computer-generated imagery; natural looking landscapes (such as fractal landscapes) are also generated via computer algorithms. A simple way to generate fractal surfaces is to use an extension of the triangular mesh method, relying on the construction of some special case of a de Rham curve, e.g. midpoint displacement. For instance, the algorithm may start with a large triangle, then recursively zoom in by dividing it into four smaller Sierpinski triangles, then interpolate the height of each point from its nearest neighbors. The creation of a Brownian surface may be achieved not only by adding noise as new nodes are created but by adding additional noise at multiple levels of the mesh. Thus a topographical map with varying levels of height can be created using relatively straightforward fractal algorithms. Some typical, easy-to-program fractals used in CGI are the plasma fractal and the more dramatic fault fractal.

Many specific techniques been researched and developed to produce highly focused computer-generated effects — e.g., the use of specific models to represent the chemical weathering of stones to model erosion and produce an "aged appearance" for a given stone-based surface.

Architectural scenes

Modern architects use services from computer graphic firms to create 3-dimensional models for both customers and builders. These computer generated models can be more accurate than traditional drawings. Architectural animation (which provides animated movies of buildings, rather than interactive images) can also be used to see the possible relationship a building will have in relation to the environment and its surrounding buildings. The processing of architectural spaces without the use of paper and pencil tools is now a widely accepted practice with a number of computer-assisted architectural design systems.

Architectural modeling tools allow an architect to visualize a space and perform "walk-throughs" in an interactive manner, thus providing "interactive environments" both at the urban and building levels. Specific applications in architecture not only include the specification of building structures (such as walls and windows) and walk-throughs but the effects of light and how sunlight will affect a specific design at different times of the day.

Architectural modeling tools have now become increasingly internet-based. However, the quality of internet-based systems still lags behind that of sophisticated in-house modeling systems.

In some applications, computer-generated images are used to "reverse engineer" historical buildings. For instance, a computer-generated reconstruction of the monastery at Georgenthal in Germany was derived from the ruins of the monastery, yet provides the viewer with a "look and feel" of what the building would have looked like in its day.

Anatomical models

Computer generated models used in skeletal animation are not always anatomically correct. However, organizations such as the Scientific Computing and Imaging Institute have developed anatomically correct computer-based models. Computer generated anatomical models can be used both for instructional and operational purposes. To date, a large body of artist produced medical images continue to be used by medical students, such as images by Frank H. Netter, e.g. Cardiac images. However, a number of online anatomical models are becoming available.

A single patient X-ray is not a computer generated image, even if digitized. However, in applications which involve CT scans a three-dimensional model is automatically produced from many single-slice x-rays, producing "computer generated image". Applications involving magnetic resonance imaging also bring together a number of "snapshots" (in this case via magnetic pulses) to produce a composite, internal image.

In modern medical applications, patient-specific models are constructed in 'computer assisted surgery'. For instance, in total knee replacement, the construction of a detailed patient-specific model can be used to carefully plan the surgery. These three-dimensional models are usually extracted from multiple CT scans of the appropriate parts of the patient's own anatomy. Such models can also be used for planning aortic valve implantations, one of the common procedures for treating heart disease. Given that the shape, diameter, and position of the coronary openings can vary greatly from patient to patient, the extraction (from CT scans) of a model that closely resembles a patient's valve anatomy can be highly beneficial in planning the procedure.

Cloth and skin images

Models of cloth generally fall into three groups:
The geometric-mechanical structure at yarn crossing
The mechanics of continuous elastic sheets
The geometric macroscopic features of cloth. 
To date, making the clothing of a digital character automatically fold in a natural way remains a challenge for many animators.

In addition to their use in film, advertising and other modes of public display, computer generated images of clothing are now routinely used by top fashion design firms.

The challenge in rendering human skin images involves three levels of realism:
Photo realism in resembling real skin at the static level
Physical realism in resembling its movements
Function realism in resembling its response to actions. 
The finest visible features such as fine wrinkles and skin pores are the size of about 100 µm or 0.1 millimetres. Skin can be modeled as a 7-dimensional bidirectional texture function (BTF) or a collection of bidirectional scattering distribution function (BSDF) over the target's surfaces.

Interactive simulation and visualization

Interactive visualization is the rendering of data that may vary dynamically and allowing a user to view the data from multiple perspectives. The applications areas may vary significantly, ranging from the visualization of the flow patterns in fluid dynamics to specific computer aided design applications. The data rendered may correspond to specific visual scenes that change as the user interacts with the system — e.g. simulators, such as flight simulators, make extensive use of CGI techniques for representing the world.

At the abstract level, an interactive visualization process involves a "data pipeline" in which the raw data is managed and filtered to a form that makes it suitable for rendering. This is often called the "visualization data". The visualization data is then mapped to a "visualization representation" that can be fed to a rendering system. This is usually called a "renderable representation". This representation is then rendered as a displayable image. As the user interacts with the system (e.g. by using joystick controls to change their position within the virtual world) the raw data is fed through the pipeline to create a new rendered image, often making real-time computational efficiency a key consideration in such applications.

Computer animation

While computer-generated images of landscapes may be static, computer animation only applies to dynamic images that resemble a movie. However, in general, the term computer animation refers to dynamic images that do not allow user interaction, and the term virtual world is used for the interactive animated environments.

Computer animation is essentially a digital successor to the art of stop motion animation of 3D models and frame-by-frame animation of 2D illustrations. Computer generated animations are more controllable than other more physically based processes, such as constructing miniatures for effects shots or hiring extras for crowd scenes, and because it allows the creation of images that would not be feasible using any other technology. It can also allow a single graphic artist to produce such content without the use of actors, expensive set pieces, or props.

To create the illusion of movement, an image is displayed on the computer screen and repeatedly replaced by a new image which is similar to the previous image, but advanced slightly in the time domain (usually at a rate of 24 or 30 frames/second). This technique is identical to how the illusion of movement is achieved with television and motion pictures.

Virtual worlds

A virtual world is an agent-based and simulated environment allowing users to interact with artificially animated characters (e.g software agent) or with other physical users, through the use of avatars. Virtual worlds are intended for its users to inhabit and interact, and the term today has become largely synonymous with interactive 3D virtual environments, where the users take the form of avatars visible to others graphically. These avatars are usually depicted as textual, two-dimensional, or three-dimensional graphical representations, although other forms are possible (auditory and touch sensations for example). Some, but not all, virtual worlds allow for multiple users.

In courtrooms 
Computer-generated imagery has been used in courtrooms, primarily since the early 2000s. However, some experts have argued that it is prejudicial. They are used to help judges or the jury to better visualize the sequence of events, evidence or hypothesis. However, a 1997 study showed that people are poor intuitive physicists and easily influenced by computer generated images. Thus it is important that jurors and other legal decision-makers be made aware that such exhibits are merely a representation of one potential sequence of events.

Broadcast and live events
Weather visualizations were the first application of CGI in television. It has now become common in weather casting to display full motion video of images captured in real-time from multiple cameras and other imaging devices. Coupled with 3D graphics symbols and mapped to a common virtual geospatial model, these animated visualizations constitute the first true application of CGI to TV.

CGI has become common in sports telecasting. Sports and entertainment venues are provided with see-through and overlay content through tracked camera feeds for enhanced viewing by the audience. Examples include the yellow "first down" line seen in television broadcasts of American football games showing the line the offensive team must cross to receive a first down. CGI is also used in association with football and other sporting events to show commercial advertisements overlaid onto the view of the playing area. Sections of rugby fields and cricket pitches also display sponsored images. Swimming telecasts often add a line across the lanes to indicate the position of the current record holder as a race proceeds to allow viewers to compare the current race to the best performance. Other examples include hockey puck tracking and annotations of racing car performance and snooker ball trajectories. Sometimes CGI on TV with correct alignment to the real world has been referred to as augmented reality.

Motion-capture 

Computer-generated imagery is often used in conjunction with motion-capture to better cover the faults that come with CGI and animation. Computer-generated imagery is limited in its practical application by how realistic it can look. Unrealistic, or badly managed computer-generated imagery can result in the Uncanny Valley effect. This effect refers to the human ability to recognize things that look eerily like humans, but are slightly off. Such ability is a fault with normal computer-generated imagery which, due to the complex anatomy of the human-body, can often fail to replicate it perfectly. This is where motion-capture comes into play. Artists can use a motion-capture rig to get footage of a human performing an action and then replicate it perfectly with computer-generated imagery so that it looks normal.

The lack of anatomically correct digital models contributes to the necessity of motion-capture as it is used with computer-generated imagery. Because computer-generated imagery reflects only the outside, or skin, of the object being rendered, it fails to capture the infinitesimally small interactions between interlocking muscle groups used in fine motor-control, like speaking. The constant motion of the face as it makes sounds with shaped lips and tongue movement, along with the facial expressions that go along with speaking are difficult to replicate by hand. Motion capture can catch the underlying movement of facial muscles and better replicate the visual that goes along with the audio, like Josh Brolin's Thanos.

See also

References

Citations

Sources

External links 

 A Critical History of Computer Graphics and Animation – a course page at Ohio State University that includes all the course materials and extensive supplementary materials (videos, articles, links).
 CG101: A Computer Graphics Industry Reference  Unique and personal histories of early computer graphics production, plus a comprehensive foundation of the industry for all reading levels.
 F/X Gods, by Anne Thompson, Wired, February 2005.
 "History Gets A Computer Graphics Make-Over" Tayfun King, Click, BBC World News (2004-11-19)
 NIH Visible Human Gallery

Visual effects
Special effects
imagery
Articles containing video clips